Lukas Cornelius Strachan (12 September 1907 – 4 March 1985) was a South African rugby union international.

Career
Strachan was born in Parys, Orange River Colony, where he left school at the end of 1925. In September 1926 he joined the Police and in March 1927, began his training. From 1927 until 1945 he played for the Pretoria Police Club's 1st team, in a total of 432 matches and was their captain from 1932–1945.

He was also the captain of the Transvaal team for three years. He was one of the great campaigners that  must become its own Union. In 1938 the Northern Transvaal Rugby Union was founded and he was also a member of the first Northern Transvaal team ever selected.

Strachan made his test match debut for the Springboks during the 1931–32 tour of Britain and Ireland, against  at Twickenham. In 1937 he toured with the Springboks to Australia and New Zealand and played in all five test matches. Strachan's last test series was against the British Isles during the 1938 tour. He also played 28 tour matches and scored six tries in the tour matches.

After his playing days were over, he remained involved in rugby as a coach and selector. For several years he was the coach of Police and from 1946 to 1966, he served as selector of Northern Transvaal.

Test history

See also
List of South Africa national rugby union players – Springbok no. 224

References

1907 births
1985 deaths
South African rugby union players
South Africa international rugby union players
Golden Lions players
Blue Bulls players
Rugby union players from the Free State (province)